The Biarritz Festival Latin America is an international film festival held annually in the French city of Biarritz, since 1979 to promote the Latin American cinema and culture with the French people and offer opportunities to distribution or coproductions to Latin American films.

Description
The Biarritz Festival of Latin American Cinema offer competitions of unreleased films in long films, short films and documentaries (in partnership with Latin Union).

Furthermore, the films in competicion each year, festival presents annually homages and retrospectives around different themes.

The festival also offer discover the Latin American culture in other forms with literary meetings, expositions of fotographies and academic conferences.

The famous Village festival of conviviality and exchange located oceanfront, allows to attend exhibitions, lectures and evening concerts for free.

Awards

 HUG for Best Feature
 Jury Award for Best Feature
 Best Actress
 Best Actor
 Feature Film Audience Award in collaboration with Air France
 Prize of the French Union of Film Critics
 HUG for Documentary, Latin Union Festival of Biarritz
 Audience Award for Best Documentary Film
 HUG for Best Short film
 Special Mentions of the Short Film Jury
 Prizes Shorts TV Numéricâble

See also 
Cinema of Latin America

References

External links 
 
Official Facebook Page

Film festivals in France
Latin American film festivals